The Bentley Mulsanne is a (performance) luxury car which was produced by Bentley Motors Limited from 1980 until 1992, though derivative models like the Continental T and Azure continued in production into the 2000s.

Contrary to its predecessors, the Bentley Mulsanne was given an actual name instead of a letter, but otherwise started like just another rebadged Rolls-Royce model, this time copied from their Silver Spirit. However, with the launch of the 'Brooklands' version, and the 1982 Mulsanne Turbo – with 50% more horsepower – the Mulsanne did start the rebuild of an appealing individual Bentley brand image.

Mulsanne
In 1980, the Rolls-Royce Silver Shadow and the Bentley T-series were replaced by the RR Silver Spirit and, as with prior models, a Bentley-badged equivalent. This time however, it was given a name: the "Mulsanne". This was derived from Bentley's motorsport history, which included five victories at the 24 Hours of Le Mans between 1924 and 1930. The 'Mulsanne Straight' is the stretch of Le Mans' race-course where cars reach their highest speeds.

The Mulsanne shared the traditional 6.75 L (6750 cc/411 in³) Rolls-Royce V8 with aluminium alloy cylinder heads. Two SU carburettors were replaced by Bosch fuel injection on all cars from 1986. All Mulsannes use a 3-speed automatic transmission.

Mulsanne Turbo

The Mulsanne Turbo was launched at the Geneva Motor Show in 1982 and produced until 1985. A Garrett AiResearch turbocharger provided a 50% increase in engine power – something not seen on a Bentley in half a century. The interior sported the usual highly polished, walnut veneered fascia, blemish-free leather upholstery, and pure wool for the carpets and headlining. 

A total of 498 standard wheelbase and 18 long-wheelbase Mulsanne Turbos were built, until they were replaced by the Bentley Turbo R in 1985, which used a fuel injected version of the same 6 litre V8 engine since 1987.

A British racing green Turbo has been used in the two James Bond novels Role of Honour and Nobody Lives for Ever by John Gardner.

Mulsanne S

The Mulsanne S was introduced in 1987. Although this model lacked its turbocharger, many of its other details were similar to the Turbo R, including that car's alloy wheels and interior, and the suspension was firmed up for a more sporting ride. The rectangular headlamps from the 1980s gave way to quad round units for 1989, and the model was produced until 1992.

Mulsanne  V16
The BMW Goldfisch V16 engine was tested in the Bentley Mulsanne as a potential "upgrade" from the turbocharged V8 engine. Unlike the BMW 7 Series, the engine fit in the bay with room for radiator and ancillaries but it was never sold to the public.

Derivative models
The Mulsanne was based on the Rolls-Royce Silver Spirit/Silver Spur introduced at the same time. It would be the basis for all Bentley models until the 1998 introduction of the Arnage.

Production

External links
Bentley-Talk: Exclusive Bentley Community and Forum

References

Mulsanne
1990s cars
Cars introduced in 1980
Cars discontinued in 1992

sk:Bentley Turbo R